Urdaneta Canton is a canton of Ecuador, located in the Los Ríos Province.  Its capital is the town of Catarama.  Its population at the 2001 census was 25,812.

Demographics
Ethnic groups as of the Ecuadorian census of 2010:
Montubio  57.1%
Mestizo  36.0%
Afro-Ecuadorian  3.8%
White  2.6%
Indigenous  0.4%
Other  0.2%

References

Cantons of Los Ríos Province